The Greater Jakarta Metropolitan Region of the Indonesian National Police, known locally as Polda Metro Jaya is the regional level of the Indonesian National Police which covers the Jakarta metropolitan area, comprising Jakarta, Tangerang, South Tangerang, Bekasi, Bekasi Regency, and Depok. Polda Metro Jaya is led by a local police chief who held the Rank of Inspector General of Police. Polda Metro Jaya is the only regional police in Indonesia which has the A+ Status due to its position to maintain a huge area of security and order in the capital of Indonesia (Jakarta) containing multiple regions and cities that surround the capital. The use of the word "Metropolitan" is because Jakarta is a metropolitan city.

Jurisdiction
Below are the departamental police commands (Polres) which are all under the command of the Greater Jakarta Metropolitan Regional Police, covering a regency/city level:

Inside Jakarta
Central Jakarta Metropolitan Police, located in Jl. Kramat Raya No.61, Senen
North Jakarta Metropolitan Police, located in Jl. Yos Sudarso No.1, Koja
West Jakarta Metropolitan Police, located in Jl. Letjen S. Parman No.31, Palmerah
South Jakarta Metropolitan Police, located in Jl. Wijaya II No.42, Kebayoran Baru
East Jakarta Metropolitan Police, located in Jl. Matraman Raya No.224, Jatinegara
Tanjung Priok Harbour Police, located in Jl. Pelabuhan Nusantara II No.1, Tanjung Priok Subdistrict, North Jakarta
Thousand Islands Police, located in Jl. Baru No.11, Cilincing, North Jakarta and Karya Island, Thousand Islands

Outside Jakarta
Tangerang City Metropolitan Police, located in Jl. Raya Daan Mogot No.52, Tangerang District.
Soekarno-Hatta Airport Police, located in Jl. C3, Tangerang
South Tangerang Metropolitan Police, located in Jl. Promoter No.1, Serpong.
Bekasi City Metropolitan Police, located in Jl. Pramuka No.79, South Bekasi
Bekasi Metropolitan Police, located in Jl. Ki Hajar Dewantara No.1, North Cikarang
Depok Metropolitan Police, located in Jl. Margonda Raya No.14, Pancoran Mas

List of Chiefs 
Down here is the list of officials that ever sit as the chief of the Metropolitan Police. They are called Kapolda Metro Jaya or simply Kapolda.

References

Law enforcement in Indonesia